The Gelehrtenschule des Johanneums ( Academic School of the Johanneum, short: Johanneum) is a Gymnasium (or Grammar School ) in Hamburg, Germany. It is Hamburg's oldest school and was founded in 1529 by Johannes Bugenhagen. The school's focus is on the teaching of Latin and ancient Greek. It is proud of having educated some of Germany's political leaders as well as some of Germany's notable scientists. The school is operated and financed by the city of Hamburg.

History 
The Johanneum was founded by Johannes Bugenhagen, the spiritual representative of the reformer Martin Luther. In 1528 he came to Hamburg to give the city an Evangelical Lutheran church order, "the Erbarn Stadt Hamborch Christlike Ordeninge". On 24 May, 1529, the Johanneum first opened its doors in the building of the secularized old St. Johannis monastery, on the site of today's Rathausmarkt as the "Latinsche Schole". The actual school rooms were in half-timbered buildings in the inner courtyard of the monastery. In the beginning, the Johanneum was a school of scholars. Later, it devoted itself to the education of sons of merchants and traders in a second branch, the citizens' school.

New building at the Speersort 

In 1826 the order for the new school was placed, but due to lack of funds it was initially not possible to implement it. From 1838 to 1840, the new building at the Speersort was finally built on the site of the cathedral demolished in 1806, where the germ cell of Hamburg once stood, the so-called Hammaburg. At the same time, the medieval Johannis monastery was demolished. The imposing classicist new building, designed by Carl Ludwig Wimmel (1786–1845) and Franz Gustav Forsmann (1795–1878), to be entered from the south through the main entrance, had two wing structures leading to today's cathedral street through arcades were connected. The building was based on competing designs by Alexis de Chateauneuf (1799–1853) and Carl Ludwig Wimmel. The patriciate of the city republic of Hamburg was brought up humanistically in the Johanneum, important scholars and authors of the early Enlightenment worked here (Hermann Samuel Reimarus, Barthold Heinrich Brockes, Michael Richey, Johann Albert Fabricius, and others), Georg Philipp Telemann and Philipp Emanuel Bach were cantors here, and this established a lasting tradition and reputation. The Johanneum survived the Great Fire of 1842, which caused numerous buildings to go up in flames.

New Maria-Louisen-Straße building 

In 1914 the Johanneum moved into what is today the building complex designed by Fritz Schumacher on Maria-Louisen-Strasse, while the old building was now used entirely by the Hamburg State and University Library. The old building was largely destroyed in the bombing raids on Hamburg in 1943, the remains (including an arcade) were removed for widening the streets in 1955 (the foundations were uncovered again in 2005 during archaeological excavations on the cathedral square). The entire complex of the Johanneum in Maria-Louisen-Strasse with the Schumacher buildings has been a listed building since 1979.[2] The Bugenhagen memorial created by Engelbert Peiffer in the courtyard has been a listed building since 1958. [3]
In 1948, three years after the end of the Second World War, a group of students from the Johanneum visited London. Frederick Wilkinson, the headteacher of the Latymer Upper School, believed that only getting to know young people can bring about understanding, reconciliation and thus lasting peace in Europe. In this spirit, he initiated the student exchange that has taken place every year since then. Godolphin and Latymer School came later. Also, the exchange with schoolchildren from Greece is carried out in a young tradition. There is also an orchestral exchange with the two partner schools in London. There has also been a hockey exchange with Magdalen College in Oxford since 1982. In 1989 the Johanneum was one of the first schools in Hamburg to set up a school exchange with Poland.
Always well endowed, it still houses an important historical library that is also open to research. In cheering competition with the 250-year-old Christianeum, which came to Hamburg with Altona in 1937, it maintained high standards. It still represents a humanistic-educative claim [4] and you can or must still take your Abitur here in the old languages Latin or ancient Greek. The study trips in the school year of the Abitur also have to lead to ancient sites.
The co-education started late at the Johanneum. Individual girls in the upper classes were admitted earlier, but it was not until 1977 that the first girls were enrolled in sexta.
There are currently two active theater working groups in the Johanneum. Furthermore, concerts of the orchestras and choirs take place every six months, the summer and Christmas concerts. Since 2004 the Johanneum has had the school newspaper, "The Chauffeur", which has since been discontinued. For this purpose, the new school newspaper “Humanistic Manifesto” was published at the end of 2011 and was also sold. In the meantime the magazine “Johanneum” appears regularly, and the Res Gestae every year.

Forum Johanneum 

The Johanneum has received a large new building through the donation of millions by a patron. It is a three-storey building with a total area of 2200 square meters, which contains art and music rooms, a cafeteria, a theater rehearsal room, and a sports hall. The Forum Johanneum was officially opened on 24 May 2007 as a new building. [5]
On the south facade there is an inscription in ancient Greek. It means translated: "All people naturally seek knowledge" and is a quote from Aristotle's metaphysics. [6]
The stairwell
In summer 2015, work began on building another new building on the school premises. It replaces the eight provisional classrooms built in container construction, which have been installed between the main building and the forum since summer 2008. The stairwell is a three-story building with a total area of 1460 square meters. It houses twelve classrooms and five differentiation rooms and, after the opening ceremony on 17 November 2016, was initially occupied by eight classes on 24 November 2016.
The name “stepped house” came from an allusion to a special design feature of the building: the terraces (“steps”) of the large outside staircase are provided with slogans in various languages, including the language of mathematics. The conception and order of the slogans symbolize the course of the languages taught in school. In addition, mathematics with the Pythagoras theorem forms a bridge between the ancient natural philosophers and the present day. [7] [8]

Twinned schools 
The school is twinned with the two London schools Latymer Upper School and Godolphin and Latymer School.

Journey to the Centre of the Earth 
In Jules Verne's novel, Journey to the Centre of the Earth, one of the main characters, Otto Lidenbrock, is a professor at the Johanneum.

Hödhütte 
Hödhütte is the country house of the Gelehrtenschule des Johanneums. Leased by the school since 1970, it is located in the Radstädter Tauern, Austria. Living conditions are very simple (the house has only one tap, students sleep in communal bunks, there is no TV and no telephone and students are not allowed to bring their cellphones). All pupils are required to spend 11 days at Hödhütte during their seventh year of schooling. This is believed to build community spirit and strengthen character. The students will also learn how to ski.

Students from all years have the opportunity to spend their holidays in Hödhütte.

Visiting historical sites 
The school feels that every student should have the opportunity of experiencing the sites of classical antiquity at first hand. The Verein zur Förderung von Schulreisen an klassische Stätten e.V. was formed to fund this activity.

Bibliotheca Johannei 
The library of the school is called Bibliotheca Johannei. It has 55,000 books written in Latin, Ancient Greek, English, French, Italian and German. The library prides itself in having the first editions of many of the milestones of European literature. The oldest book is a Latin bible dating from 1491.

Alumni society 
The school has an alumni society called Verein ehemaliger Schüler der Gelehrtenschule des Johanneums zu Hamburg e.V.. It has 1,300 members. One of its main tasks is to provide money for school activities.

Former teachers 
Former teachers of the school include:

 Johannes Classen (Director / Head teacher 1864–1874)
 Hermann Alexander Diels
 Johann Gottfried Gurlitt
 Richard Hoche (Director / Head teacher 1874–1887)
 Johann Hübner
 Adolf Kiessling
 Ernst Gottlob Köstlin
 Hermann Cäsar Hannibal Schubert
 Gottlob Reinhold Sievers
 Georg Philipp Telemann (Cantor (church))
 Carl Philipp Emanuel Bach (Cantor (church))
 Christian Friedrich Gottlieb Schwenke (Director of Church Music and Cantor)

Former pupils 

Former students of the school include:

Marlo von Tresckow
Gant von Tresckow
Leon Leue
Carlotta Kenkel
Clara Brockhaus
Emilia Enders
Cougar von Tresckow
Adrian Mahnke
 Henry Schrader
 Arthur William Paas
 Christian Wilhelm Alers
 Wilhelm Amsinck
 Eduard Arning
Luis Rothenberg 
 Heinrich Barth
 Johann Bernhard Basedow
 Marcus Speh Birkenkrahe
 "Büdi" Christian Blunck
 Peter van Bohlen
 Justus Brinckmann
 Barthold Heinrich Brockes
 Johann Heinrich Burchard
 Johannes Classen
 Diedrich Diederichsen
 Hans Driesch
 Johann Franz Encke
 Barthold Feind
 Gottfried Forck
 Hinnerk Fock
 Ludwig Gerling
 Ralph Giordano
 Martin Haller
 Tobias Hauke
 Friedrich Hebbel
 Gerrit Heesemann
 Heinrich Hertz
 Gustav Ludwig Hertz
 Gerhard Herzberg
 Johann Michael Hudtwalcker
 Hans Jauch
 Walter Jens
 Peter Katzenstein
 Harry Graf Kessler
 Bernhard Klefeker
 Johann Carl Knauth
 Franz Knoop
 Theodor von Kobbe
 Volker Lechtenbrink
 Eduard Lohse
 Alfred Mann
 Walter Matthaei
 Max Mendel
 Eduard Meyer
 Daniel Gotthilf Moldenhawer
 Johann Georg Mönckeberg
 August Johann Wilhelm Neander
 Hans Georg Niemeyer
 Max Nonne
 Hans Erich Nossack
 Adolf Overweg
 Fredrik Pacius
 Carl Friedrich Petersen
 Wolfgang Petersen
 Martin Eduard Warner Poelchau
 Robert Wichard Pohl
 Wolfgang Ratke
 Hermann Samuel Reimarus
 Johann Wilhelm Rautenberg
 Grigorij Richters
 Johann Rist
 Erwin Rohde
 Albrecht Roscher
 Thomas G. Rosenmeyer
 Philipp Otto Runge
 Hjalmar Schacht
 Heinrich Gottlieb Schellhaffer
 Leif Schrader
 Carl August Schröder
 Emil Gottlieb Schuback
 Friedemann Schulz von Thun
 Ulrich Seelemann
 Gottfried Semper
 Kurt Sieveking
 Eduard Wilhelm Sievers
 Wilhelm Sievers
 Morris Simmonds
 Bruno Streckenbach
 Georg Michael Telemann
 Bernhard Tollens
 Karl Ulmer
 Paul Gerson Unna
 Werner von Melle
 Aby Warburg
 Friedrich Wasmann
 Christian Wegner
 Dietrich Wersich
 Wilhelm Heinrich Westphal
 Johann Hinrich Wichern
 Henrik Wiese
 Wolfgang Zeidler
 Paultheo von Zezschwitz
 Axel Zwingenberger

See also 
Wilhelm-Gymnasium (Hamburg)

References

External links 
 Homepage of the school 
 Students build their own homepage about their countryhouse Hödhütte 
 Homepage of the alumni society 

 
Educational institutions established in the 1520s
Gymnasiums in Germany
Buildings and structures in Hamburg-Nord
1529 establishments in the Holy Roman Empire